Hugo Filipe da Silva Cunha (18 February 1977 – 25 June 2005) was a Portuguese footballer who played as a midfielder.

Over the course of six seasons he amassed Primeira Liga totals of 125 games and seven goals, in a career cut short at the age of 28. The suspected cause of death was sudden cardiac arrest.

Football career
Born in Barreiro, Setúbal District, Cunha began his career at local F.C. Barreirense, as a youth and an early senior. He made his professional debuts with modest S.C. Campomaiorense in the Primeira Liga, moving to Vitória de Guimarães after one sole season.

After four years in Minho being regularly used by the first team, although rarely as a starter, Cunha moved to fellow top division club U.D. Leiria for 2004–05. In the following off-season, he died suddenly during a football match played with friends in Montemor-o-Novo, aged 28.

References

External links

1977 births
2005 deaths
Sportspeople from Barreiro, Portugal
Portuguese footballers
Association football midfielders
Primeira Liga players
Segunda Divisão players
F.C. Barreirense players
S.C. Campomaiorense players
Vitória S.C. players
U.D. Leiria players
Association football players who died while playing
Sport deaths in Portugal